Irakli Shekiladze  (born 17 September 1992) is Georgian footballer. He plays as a striker for Swiss club FC Emmenbrücke.

Career

FC Emmenbrücke
In 2020, Shekiladze joined Swiss club FC Emmenbrücke.

References

External links
 
 UEFA profile

1992 births
Footballers from Tbilisi
Living people
Association football forwards
Footballers from Georgia (country)
Georgia (country) youth international footballers
Georgia (country) under-21 international footballers
Serie B players
Serie C players
Serie D players
Empoli F.C. players
F.C. Südtirol players
Latina Calcio 1932 players
Spezia Calcio players
S.S.D. Lucchese 1905 players
Savona F.B.C. players
A.C. Tuttocuoio 1957 San_Miniato players
Expatriate footballers from Georgia (country)
Expatriate footballers in Italy
Expatriate footballers in Switzerland